David Nash may refer to:

 David Nash (artist) (born 1945), British sculptor
 David Nash (cricketer) (born 1978), English cricketer
 David Nash (linguist), Australian linguist
 David Nash (physician), Professor of Health Policy at the Jefferson College of Population Health
 David P. Nash (1948–1968), United States Army soldier and Medal of Honor recipient
 David Nash (rugby union) (1939–2016), head coach to Wales national rugby union team
 David Nash (basketball), former American basketball player